Chhattisgarh Public Service Commission, known commonly as CGPSC is a state government agency serving the state of Chhattisgarh, India. It is responsible for conducting Civil Services examinations and Competitive Examinations to select the eligible candidates for various  civil services and departmental posts.

History
The commission came into existence under the provision of Act 315 of Part XIV Constitution of India on 3 May 2001, when its respective state Chhattisgarh was formed on 1 November 2000 by partitioning the several districts of Madhya Pradesh, into one state.

Functions
CGPSC performs its functions as authorized by Act 315 under the supervision of Government of Chhattisgarh and state governor.

 Conducting recruitment process of the selected candidates.
 Conducting interviews and screening tests of eligible candidates.
 Conducting competitive and departmental examinations.
 To maintain and decide service rules.
 Advice to the Chhattisgarh Government.

Commission profile
CGPSC members are appointed or removed by the state governor. Their term of service is set to six years which starts from the date of appointment.

See also

 List of Public service commissions in India

References

External links

Government of Chhattisgarh
2001 establishments in Chhattisgarh
State public service commissions of India